Arab Region may refer to:

Arab Scout Region (World Organization of the Scout Movement)
Arab Region (World Association of Girl Guides and Girl Scouts)
Arab world